Cymatura nyassica is a species of beetle in the family Cerambycidae. It was described by Stephan von Breuning in 1935. It is known from Tanzania, Malawi, and Zimbabwe.

Subspecies
 Cymatura nyassica nyassica Breuning, 1935
 Cymatura nyassica rhodesica Breuning, 1964

References

Xylorhizini
Beetles described in 1935